Oulu TV Mast is a mast in the Huttukylä district in Oulu, Finland. The mast is also known as Kiiminki TV Mast as it is located in the area of the former Kiiminki municipality.

It replaced the old Kiiminki TV Mast, which was demolished by explosion in 1994.

See also
List of tallest structures in Finland

References

External links
 Video:The old Kiiminki TV mast being exploded

Buildings and structures in Oulu
Towers completed in 1993
Communication towers in Finland
Transmitter sites in Finland
1993 establishments in Finland